Coombe is a settlement in the English county of Devon, about  northwest of the town of Sidmouth at .

Villages in Devon